Mauro Andrés Méndez Acosta (born 17 January 1999) is a Uruguayan professional footballer who plays as a forward for Argentine Primera División club Estudiantes de La Plata.

Career
A former youth academy player of Defensor Sporting, Méndez joined Montevideo Wanderers in February 2017. He made his professional debut for the club on 2 June 2019 in a 0–3 league defeat against Cerro.

On July 28, 2022, Estudiantes de La Plata acquires the services of the 23-year-old striker from the Montevideo Wanderers club for 1,700,000 dollars for 70% of the record, signing a contract until June 2025.

Career statistics

Club

References

External links
 

1999 births
Living people
Footballers from Salto, Uruguay
Association football forwards
Uruguayan footballers
Montevideo Wanderers F.C. players
Estudiantes de La Plata footballers
Uruguayan Primera División players
Uruguayan expatriate footballers
Uruguayan expatriate sportspeople in Argentina
Expatriate footballers in Argentina